The 2010–11 OK Liga was the 42nd season of the top-tier league of rink hockey in Spain.

Reus Deportiu conquered its fifth title, the first one since 1973.

Competition format
For this season, the league reduced the number of teams to 14. As it was approved for the previous season, the league continued without playoffs at the end of the round-robin tournament.

League table

Copa del Rey

The 2011 Copa del Rey was the 68th edition of the Spanish men's roller hockey cup. It was played in Blanes between the eight first qualified teams after the first half of the season.

Barcelona Sorli Discau won its 18th cup.

References

External links
Real Federación Española de Patinaje

OK Liga seasons
2010 in roller hockey
2011 in roller hockey
2010 in Spanish sport
2011 in Spanish sport